Abdi Warsame Isaq (d. September 10, 2011 in London, England), or more famously known as Colonel Abdi Warsame Isaq, was the chairman of the Southern Somali National Movement (SSNM), a military faction during the Somalia war. It consisted mainly of Gaadsan clan Surre, Biyamaal and other southern Mahad Dir clans.

History 
Abdi Warsame Isaq hailed from the Dir clan of the Dir clan family, more importantly from the Gaadsen branch of Dir. Formally allied with Aideed, the chairman of the SSNM, Colonel Abdi Warsame in 1993 broke with General Aideed and took part of the SSNM with him when he aligned himself with Ali Mahdi.

References 

Somalian military personnel
2011 deaths
Year of birth missing